The Adventures of Huckleberry Finn is a 1939 Metro-Goldwyn-Mayer film adaptation of Mark Twain's 1884 novel of the same name, starring Mickey Rooney in the title role. The supporting cast features Walter Connolly, William Frawley and Rex Ingram. It was remade by MGM in 1960. A musical version was released in 1974.

Plot summary

Cast
 Mickey Rooney as Huckleberry Finn
 Walter Connolly as the "King"
 William Frawley as the "Duke"
 Rex Ingram as Jim
 Lynne Carver as Mary Jane
 Jo Ann Sayers as Susan
 Minor Watson as Captain Brandy
 Elisabeth Risdon as the widow Douglas
 Victor Kilian as "Pap" Finn
 Clara Blandick as Miss Watson
 Harry Cording as Man Stealing Watermelon (uncredited)
 Frank Darien as Old Jailer (uncredited)

Reception
Most critics found the film mediocre. B. R. Crisler of The New York Times felt that the picture was "more Mickey than Huckleberry" and called it an "average, workmanlike piece of cinematic hokum" that "affords little, if any, insight into the realistic boyhood world of which old Mark wrote with such imperishable humor." A reviewer for Variety magazine wrote that the adaptation "has not been able to catch the rare and sparkling humor and general sincerity of the author's original. Furthermore, young Rooney seems too mature and assured in manner and expression for his years. Although he troupes in fine style, the impression remains that it's a theatric presentation."

Film Daily called the treatment of the story "very flat and mechanical and uninteresting," adding, "Mickey Rooney does his best, and his fans may accept him as he appears and think he is great. To the lovers of Mark Twain it can only prove a disappointment." Harrison's Reports called it "just fairly good entertainment." John Mosher of The New Yorker called it "a perfunctory, commonplace job, pretty creaky and in the manner of those revival pieces some think quaint ... Aside from being a step for Mr. Rooney, this picture accomplishes nothing."

See also
 List of films featuring slavery

Plot summary

References

External links
 
 
 
 

1939 films
1930s adventure comedy-drama films
American black-and-white films
American adventure comedy-drama films
American road comedy-drama films
1930s English-language films
Films scored by Franz Waxman
Films based on Adventures of Huckleberry Finn
Films directed by Richard Thorpe
Metro-Goldwyn-Mayer films
1930s road movies
Films produced by Joseph L. Mankiewicz
Films with screenplays by Waldo Salt
Films set in the 19th century
1939 comedy films
1939 drama films
1930s American films